The Religious Administration of Muslims of Crimea (RAMC,) is the central religious administrative body for Muslims in Crimea. It was established in 1991.

In 2016, the Religious Administration of Muslims of Crimea, due to Annexation of Crimea by the Russian Federation, was relocated to Kyiv, the capital of Ukraine.

The organization publishes its own literature and a daily newspaper called “Hidiaet,” in the Tatar language.

References

External links
Official site (in Ukraine)

Islam in Crimea
Organizations based in Crimea
Islamic organizations based in Ukraine